The Middle East Peace Facilitation Act of 1993 (P.L. 102-125, S.1418) was signed by President Bill Clinton on October 28, 1993, a month after the signing of the Oslo Accords, an agreement between Israel and the Palestinian Liberation Organization (PLO). In the act, the United States' Congress gave the President the conditional authority to lift sanctions against the PLO and ordered the U.S. State Department to monitor the PLO's compliance with the Accords. This was designed to provide aid funding to the Palestinians in hopes of promoting the Middle East Peace Process.

History
For hundreds of years, the Middle East has been a hotbed of violent disagreement, extremist tactics and nearly continual upheaval. Discord between Jews and Muslims in the region containing their holiest of sites seems like a problem without a solution. In spite of this there have been a long series of attempted solutions to the problem of the Holy Land, from European powers, from the United Nations and eventually the United States. One of the earliest American solutions was the Middle East Peace Facilitation Act of 1993. An attempt to use the economic and finical might to promote the post-Oslo peace, the Act is a fascinating example of the American domestic policy process and how it can effect the nature of world events. Ultimately, the Peace Act would not save the fragile peace planted in the early 1990s, but it would create a precedent of American aid to both sides of the Israeli-Palestinian conflict which continues today.

Policy process

Original language

Conditions of presidential waiver

Text of the Middle East Peace Facilitation Act of 1993

Subsequent relevant legislation

International events after passage

References

Israeli–Palestinian peace process
State of Palestine–United States relations